Lentzea albidocapillata is a Gram-positive bacterium from the genus Lentzea which has been isolated from tissue specimen of a patient in Germany.

References

Pseudonocardiales
Bacteria described in 1995